Dato' Hajji Azwanddin Hamzah is a businessman, philanthropist and political activist, known to be a critic on the issues of corruption in Malaysia.

Personal life and education 
Azwanddin was born on 26 September 1973 in Kuala Lumpur, Malaysia. He is married and has four children.

Azwanddin received his early education at Sekolah Rendah Jenis Kebangsaan Cina Lee Rubber, Gombak. He then continued his secondary school education at Chong Hwa Secondary School, Kuala Lumpur where he achieved his Sijil Rendah Pelajaran, and Sekolah Menengah Chong Hwa Sin, Kuala Terengganu. Azwanddin Hamzah obtained his Bachelor (1995) and Master of Business Administration (1996) from Western University, Canada.

Azwanddin is fluent in Malay, Mandarin, and English languages which credits this to the multicultural setting of Malaysia and the years of education in Chinese-medium schools.

In his spare time, Azwanddin is passionate about football and horse riding. He is currently the President of Jaringan Melayu Malaysia Football Club which was the champion of the 2016/2017 Kuala Lumpur Football Association Super League.

Business 
Azwanddin is currently the Chairman of T&D Construction Sdn Bhd since 2010, which forms as one of the three companies of the T&D Group of Companies. Construction became the core business of T&D Group of Companies since its establishment in 2002, now with structured diversification in specialist sectors related to construction.

Other notable memberships of Azwanddin include the membership of the Malaysia – Indonesia Business Council to enhance private sector bilateral trade relation between Malaysia and Indonesia through the promotion of mutually beneficial business and investment opportunities. Of note, Azwanddin is also a member of the Relationship, Lanzhou Lanmarch eCommerce Technology Ltd. of China where he channels his interest in promoting halal products in Lanzhou and China. Azwanddin is also the honorary advisor of Koperasi Jaringan Melayu Selangor Berhad, which was established to support the efforts and struggles in developing and assisting the advancement of the Malay socioeconomic standing.

Previously, from 2015 to 2017, Azwanddin held a position in the Board of Directors of Amanah Nusantara National, a corporate consultant organisation to develop Cirebon into an integrated developed city to accommodate and support the national development and economic plans of Indonesia.

Non-governmental organisations

Regional cooperation 
As a board member of the Yayasan Generasi Amanah Indonesia, Azwanddin seeks to uphold cooperation between ASEAN countries such as Malaysia, Indonesia, Singapore, Thailand and the Philippines in welfare activities through regional economic activity embodied. Azwanddin is also interested in the arts, particularly in upholding Malay performing arts through his involvement as the vice chairman of Yayasan Nusantara.

Anti-corruption stance 
Through many capacities, Azwanddin is a firm believer of honesty and integrity in work and continually expresses his stance against corruption issues in Malaysia.

Jaringan Melayu Malaysia (JMM) 
Azwanddin is the founder of Jaringan Melayu Malaysia (JMM) in 2008. JMM is a non-governmental organisation that aims to promote racial harmony and unity through upholding the constitutional rights of Malays as well as the rights of other races in Malaysia. In particular, JMM strives to fight any foreign elements that have the potential to disrupt the racial harmony and unity in Malaysia. JMM also aims to uphold the integrity and leadership of professionals in managing the country's assets.

Prior to 2011, JMM had struggled to find relevance in the current Malaysian political and socio-economic climate and it was through the extraordinary efforts of Azwanddin that key issues promoted by JMM such as the anti-corruption stance, received prominence in the Malaysian sphere.

JMM began to receive significant public and media attention due to its anti-LGBTQ stance since 2011. As a devout Muslim and the president of JMM, Azwanddin voiced his concerns on the influence of LGBTQ in youth, the rise of HIV diagnosis among these communities and the resulting breakdown of marriages due to one partner being a closeted gay or lesbian. Of course, these views do not resonate with the current Malaysian and global liberal views on sexuality and JMM's stance on LGBTQ remains a controversy to these parties.

Cerebral Palsy 
Cerebral palsy is close to Azwanddin's heart as one of his sons suffers from this condition. As a member of the Family Support Group of Cerebral Palsy at Kuala Lumpur Hospital, Azwanddin provides his whole-support towards the cause.

Youth Empowerment 
Azwanddin believes that youth is important for the Malaysia's development and in 2017, he became the patron of Rojak United - a voluntary youth engagement and data-driven entity focusing on apolitical civic issues concerning youth.

Awards 
Azwanddin was awarded with Darjah Indera Mahkota which carried a Datoship title from the Sultan of Pahang in October 2016. In 2018, he was conferred the Malaysian Civil Defence Force (APM) Honorary Colonel Award

References 

1973 births
Living people
People from Kuala Lumpur
Malaysian people of Malay descent
Malaysian Muslims
Malaysian businesspeople
Malaysian activists
Malaysian political people
21st-century Malaysian politicians